Salomé Ureña Díaz de Henríquez (October 21, 1850 - March 6, 1897) was a Dominican poet and teacher, being one of the central figures of 19th-century lyrical poetry and advocator for women’s education in the Dominican Republic, influenced by the positivist schools and the normal education of Eugenio María de Hostos, of whom she was an advantaged student. Her works focused on patriotism and family environment. 

Although not very extensive, she managed to attract the attention of much of Latin America due to the depth of  her works. Among his most notable works are: Offering to the Homeland, The bird and the nest and Shadows, To my mother, among others.

Life 
She was born in Santo Domingo, Dominican Republic on October 21, 1850. She was the daughter of writer Nicolás Ureña de Mendozaand Gregoria Díaz de León both from Santo Domingo, their marriage union lasted five years. Her father was a politician and journalist who held positions in the judiciary and congress. Despite the separation of her parents, the relationship of Salomé with her father was endearing and undoubtedly fundamental in her intellectual and moral formation.

Salomé learned to read with her mother and at the age of four, which reveals the care of both parents, who gave a solid training to Salomé. She attended the elementary schools of her time, while her studies as a teenager was done under the guidance of her father, from whom she received extensive literary instruction.

Salomé learned the verses of her father's favorite bards, her cultural level was nourished by Spanish classics as well English and French literature.

She began writing verses at the age of fifteen, later publishing her first works at the age of seventeen, with a characteristic imprint of spontaneity and tenderness. In 1867 she published her first works under the pseudonym "Herminia", a name she used until 1874.

On February 11, 1880, at the age of twenty-nine, she married the doctor and writer Francisco Henríquez y Carvajal, a politician who achieved the presidency of the Dominican Republic. She had four children with him: Francisco, Pedro, Max and Camila. Her children’s would later become highly respected figures of contemporary literature of the mid- and late twentieth century as writers, philosophers, poets, humanists and art critics.

Contribution to education  

Around 1881, Salomé with the help of her husband opened one of the first centers of higher education for young women in the Dominican Republic, which she named "Instituto de Señoritas".  Within five years, the first six female teachers had graduated from the Institute, something uncommon at the time. The first graduating class included Mercedes Laura Aguiar, Leonor M. Feltz, Altagracia Henríquez Perdomo, Luisa Ozema Pellerano, Catalina Pou, and Ana Josefa Puello.

Legacy
In 1874, at the age of 23, Salomé participated in the publication of an anthology of contemporary poets. "La Lira de Quisqueya", a work that was circulated about the first anniversary of the overthrow of the despotic government of Buenaventura Báez and in which seven poems by Salomé were included: The Glory of Progress, Remembrance of a Proscript, Melancholy, Answer, My Homeland, Gratitude, and A Hymn. 
In the investitures held between 1887 and 1893, she assumes more defined positions on political level, questions the despotism of the Ulises Heureaux regime, religious intolerance and authoritarianism; she echoes the voices that denounce the intransigence of some of the sectors.

With the passage of time, her work became tragic and sad with poems such as In hours of anguish; or patriotic and energetic as can be seen in her poems A la Patria y Ruinas. In later years, she included autobiographical themes in her poems, as can be seen in Mi Pedro, dedicated to her son, perhaps her most affectionate poem, in The Arrival of Winter and a book that became very popular called Esteban, where she talks about her country, her family, plants and flowers.

Death 
Ureña died on March 6, 1897, at age 46, due to complications of tuberculosis. Buried in the church of Nuestra Señora de las Mercedes and then, in 1972, she was transferred to the Pantheon of the Homeland.

Partial Bibliography
 1873 - The glory of progress
 1876 - Ruins
 1877 - The arrival of winter
 1878 - Faith in the future
 1880 - Anacaona
 1880 - Poetry of Salomé Ureña de Henríquez
 1881 - Shadows
 1897 - My Pedro
 1902 - Herminia

Ancestry

Note

References

External links
 Salomé Ureña Fan page
 Biography
 Salomé Ureña Page

Poems
 José E. Marcano selection
 PUCMM selection
 Los-poetas.com selection

1850 births
1897 deaths
People from Santo Domingo
Dominican Republic people of Canarian descent
Dominican Republic people of French descent
Dominican Republic people of Spanish descent
Dominican Republic women writers
Dominican Republic women poets
19th-century Dominican Republic poets
19th-century women writers